Nike Grind is a collection of recycled materials developed by Nike that is composed of pre-consumer manufacturing scraps, recycled post-consumer shoes from the Reuse-A-Shoe program, and unsellable footwear. The purpose of Nike Grind is to eliminate waste and close the loop on Nike's product lifecycle. 

The materials are used to make various Nike products, athletic surfaces and products for other companies. Materials recycled include rubber, foam, fiber, leather and textile blends, which are separated and ground into a wide range of granules.

Recycling Process
Nike Grind materials are primarily composed of manufacturing scraps but also include a mixture of recycled shoes (including those that cannot be sold). Many of the recycled shoes are collected through Nike's Reuse-A-Shoe program which began in the early 1990s and takes in around 1.5 million pairs annually. The program takes worn-out shoes (of any brand) that are donated by consumers often at Nike retail stores. After donation, the shoes are shipped to one of two recycling facilities in the United States or Belgium where they are then processed into Nike Grind materials. 

Three different types of material are taken from each shoe: rubber from the outsole, foam from the midsole and fabric from the upper. Then, the separated materials of rubber, foam, fiber, leather, and textile blends are ground into granules that can be reconstituted as a number of different products and materials.

Uses
Nike Grind materials are incorporated into some Nike products, including footwear, apparel, and the yarn that composes them. These materials are also used in athletic and play surfaces like running tracks, turf fields, playground surfaces, courts, weight room flooring, and carpet underlay. Since its inception, Nike Grind has been used in over 1 billion square feet of sports surfaces in total.

The first synthetic turf soccer field installed with Nike Grind rubber was Douglas park. That surface was donated by Nike and the U.S. Soccer Foundation. Nike Grind has since been incorporated into numerous athletic surfaces throughout the world, including the court at Golden 1 Center in Sacramento, California, training facilities at Yankee Stadium in New York, and the track at Old Trafford Stadium in Manchester, England, among others. 

Additionally, using Nike Grind materials in a building project may help gain points toward obtaining LEED certification, depending on how much is incorporated and what other sustainable materials are used.

References

External links
 
 Nike Innovation Challenge

Recycling
Recycling industry
Nike brands
Uses of shoes
1994 establishments in Oregon
1994 introductions